Day of the Dead is an American horror television series based on the film of same name that premiered on Syfy on October 15, 2021 and concluded on December 17, 2021.

Premise
Six strangers try to survive the first 24 hours of an undead invasion.

Cast and characters
 Keenan Tracey as Cam McDermott, a high school senior and son of a local police detective who spends his free time working odd jobs to get out of his small Pennsylvania hometown
 Daniel Doheny as Luke Bowman, the son of town mayor, Paula Bowman
 Natalie Malaika as Lauren Howell, a sarcastic assistant mortician at the local mortuary
 Morgan Holmstrom as Sarah Blackwood, former Special Forces now working on a fracking crew outside of town. She discovers a mysterious body which plunges her into the middle of a zombie invasion.
 Kristy Dawn Dinsmore as Amy, a life coach and daughter of the town doctor. When the dead start to rise, she begins a transformation as she fights for survival.
 Miranda Frigon as Paula Bowman, the town Mayor
 Christopher Russell as Trey Bowman, Paula's husband and Luke's father
 Dejan Loyola as Jai Fisher, a doctor and Amy's fiancé

Episodes

Production
In February 2020, it was announced Syfy had given a straight to series order of 10 episodes for a series based on Day of the Dead. The show will be written by Jed Elinoff and Scott Thomas who also will serve as showrunners. In October 2020, it was announced Keenan Tracey, Daniel Doheny, Natalie Malaika, Morgan Holmstrom and Kristy Dawn Dinsmore had been cast as regulars in the series. The series premiered on October 15, 2021.

Reception

See also 
 List of television series based on films

References

External links 
 

2020s American horror television series
2021 American television series debuts
2021 American television series endings
American horror fiction television series
English-language television shows
Live action television shows based on films
Syfy original programming